The Tsunami Benefit split CD single was released in 2005 on Century Media, featuring Napalm Death, The Haunted, and Heaven Shall Burn, with one song from each. It is limited to 1000 copies.
"Strassenkampf" is a Die Skeptiker cover.

Track listing

Personnel 
 Napalm Death
 Barney Greenway – lead vocals
 Mitch Harris – guitars, backing vocals
 Shane Embury – bass
 Danny Herrera – drums

 The Haunted
 Peter Dolving – vocals
 Anders Björler – lead guitar
 Patrik Jensen – rhythm guitar
 Jonas Björler – bass
 Per Möller Jensen – drums

 Heaven Shall Burn
 Marcus Bischoff – vocals
 Maik Weichert – guitars
 Alexander Dietz – guitars
 Eric Bischoff – bass
 Matthias Voigt – drums

2005 EPs
The Haunted (Swedish band) albums
Heaven Shall Burn albums
Napalm Death EPs
Split EPs
Century Media Records EPs
Charity albums